Dr. Vikram Singh (born 22 May 1950) is an Indian educationist and retired Indian Police Service (IPS) officer. He joined the IPS in 1974, and held the post of Director General of Police in the state of Uttar Pradesh during the period June 2007 – September 2009. He retired from the IPS in May 2010.

Summary of Experience

Pro Chancellor – Noida International University (Plot No. 1, Sector 17-A, Yamuna Expressway, Gautam Budh Nagar, U.P.) – Since Jun'15 till date 
Vice Chancellor – Noida International University (Plot No. 1, Sector 17-A, Yamuna Expressway, Gautam Budh Nagar, U.P.) –  Nov'10 Till Jun'15  
Director General – Home Guards  –  Sep'09 to May'10
Director General of Police – Uttar Pradesh –  Jun'07 to Sep'09
Additional Director General – Central Industrial Security Force  –  Oct'06 to Jun'07
Additional Director General – Inter State Border Force  –  Sep'03 to Oct'06
Additional Director General – Law & Order, Crime, Special Task Force – Oct'02 to Sep'03
Inspector General – Varanasi Zone & Meerut Zone – Jul'01 – Oct'02
Inspector General – Special Task Force, was responsible for establishing, starting and efficiently running this elite force for the first three years. Also established similar units in three other states.  –  Oct'97 to Jul'01
Inspector General – Meerut Zone  –  Dec'96 to Oct'97
Deputy Inspector General – Moradabad Range & Meerut Range  –  Oct'91 to Dec'96
Senior Superintendent of Police – Etah, Nainital, Agra & Kanpur  –  Sep'81 to Feb'91
Superintendent of Police – Agra & Hamirpur  –  Jun'79 to Sep'81
ADC to Governor of Uttar Pradesh  –  Sep'77 to Jun'79
Assistant Superintendent of Police – Mirzapur  –  Dec'76 to Sep'77

Awards and accolades

President's Police Medal for Gallantry 1986
Bar to President's Police Medal for Gallantry 1987
President's Police Medal for Gallantry 1988
Bar to President's Police Medal for Gallantry 1989
President's Police Medal for Long & Meritorious Service 1990
President's Police Medal for Distinguished Service 1996
Kathin Seva Medal 2001
Bar to Kathin Seva Medal 2002
Limca Book Of Records 2014 – mentions him The most Highly Decorated Police Officer In India.
NRI Award - 2015
Akhil Bharat Vidwat Parishad Award - 2015 @ Varanasi bestowed upon by Hon'ble Shri Rajnath Singh Ji, Home Minister, Govt. of India

Publications
Ecosystems of Central Himalayas
Human Rights and Police – National Award presented by National Human Rights Commission, New Delhi

References

External links
DR. VIKRAM SINGH

1950 births
Living people
Indian Police Service officers
People from Deoria district
University of Allahabad alumni
Director Generals of Uttar Pradesh Police